Stéphane Gillet (born 20 August 1977) is a Luxembourgian footballer.  He played in goal twenty times for Luxembourg.  He has played for clubs in several countries, including Jeunesse Esch and Racing FC Union Luxembourg in Luxembourg, Chester City in England, SV Elversberg in Germany, and FC Wil in Switzerland.

Club career
Gillet started his career with Belgian side Standard Liège but made his senior debut with Luxembourg outfit Spora Luxembourg in the 1998/1999 season. He was then lured away by German Regionalliga Süd side SV Elversberg where he spent two seasons before moving to French giants Paris Saint-Germain as the team's third goalkeeper. Although he played for the return leg of the second round of the 2001/2002 UEFA Cup, he spent most of his time in the reserves. He joined Swiss Superleague team FC Wil in 2003 and experienced relegation as well as winning the Swiss Cup with them. After that season he returned to Luxembourg but had a two-month spell with English lower league team Chester City.

In 2007, Gillet was contracted to Jeunesse Esch for three years.

He has joined Rugby Club Luxembourg, for whose second team he plays as a back row.

International career
Gillet made his debut for Luxembourg in an October 2000 World Cup qualification match against Russia. He went on to earn 20 caps. He played in 8 World Cup qualification matches.

He played his final international match in November 2006 against Togo.

Honours
Swiss Cup: 1
 2004

References

External links
 
 

1977 births
Living people
Sportspeople from Luxembourg City
Luxembourgian footballers
Luxembourgian expatriate footballers
Association football goalkeepers
Standard Liège players
SV Elversberg players
Paris Saint-Germain F.C. players
FC Wil players
Racing FC Union Luxembourg players
Chester City F.C. players
Jeunesse Esch players
Ligue 1 players
Swiss Super League players
English Football League players
Luxembourgian expatriate sportspeople in France
Luxembourgian expatriate sportspeople in Germany
Luxembourgian expatriate sportspeople in Switzerland
Expatriate footballers in Germany
Expatriate footballers in France
Expatriate footballers in Switzerland
Expatriate footballers in England
Luxembourg international footballers